The 2017 USA Sevens (also sometimes referred to as the 2017 Las Vegas Sevens) was the fourteenth edition of the USA Sevens tournament, and the fifth tournament of the 2016–17 World Rugby Sevens Series. The tournament was played on 3–5 March 2017 at Sam Boyd Stadium in Las Vegas, Nevada.

Format
The teams were drawn into four pools of four teams each. Each team plays all the others in their pool once. 3, 2 or 1 points for a win, draw or loss. The top two teams from each pool advance to the Cup brackets. The bottom two teams go into the Challenge trophy brackets.

Teams
The main tournament will consist of the fifteen core teams plus Chile, who qualified by finishing as the best ranked non-core team of the 2017 Sudamérica Rugby Sevens

Pool Stage

Pool A

Pool B

Pool C

Pool D

Knockout stage

13th Place

Challenge Trophy

5th Place

Cup

Tournament placings

Source: World Rugby (archived)

See also
 2017 USA Women's Sevens

References

2017
USA Sevens 2017
2016–17 World Rugby Sevens Series
2017 in American rugby union
2017 in sports in Nevada
USA Sevens
2017 rugby sevens competitions